The Sudomekh Shipyard was created during the 1930s as a specialized submarine shipyard in Leningrad, USSR, probably from facilities of the adjacent Admiralty Shipyard. It was designated Factory No. 196 when the Soviets numbered all of their factories in 1936. The shipyard was damaged during World War II, but was repaired and became one of the main Soviet submarine production centers during the Cold War. It was merged into the Admiralty Shipyard in 1970.

See also 
 List of ships of Russia by project number
 List of Soviet and Russian submarine classes

Bibliography
 

Shipbuilding companies of the Soviet Union
Shipyards of Russia
Manufacturing companies based in Saint Petersburg